The  was one of the armaments expansion plan of the Imperial Japanese Navy (IJN).

Background
In 1939, the IJN started new naval armaments expansion plan. It extended to 80 warships and 75 Naval Air Groups by 1.6 billion JPY.

Table of vessels
{| class="wikitable" width="90%"
| width="12%" | Category
| width="6%" | Class
| width="8%" | Vessel number(s)
| width="20%" | Completed
| width="16%" | Converted
| width="12%" | Cancelled
|-
| Training cruiser
| Katori
| #101
| Kashii (#101)
| 
| 
|-
| Minelayer
| Hatsutaka
| #102
| Wakataka (#102)
| 
| 
|-
| Combat support ship
| Sunosaki
| #103
| Sunosaki (#103)
| 
| 
|-
| Destroyer Type-B
| Akizuki
| #104–109
| Akizuki (#104), Teruzuki (#105),  Suzutsuki (#106), Hatsuzuki (#107), Niizuki (#108), Wakatsuki (#109)
| 
| 
|-
| Battleship
| Yamato
| rowspan="2"|#110–111
| 
| #110 was converted to aircraft carrier
| #111
|-
| Aircraft carrier
| Shinano
| Shinano (#110)
| 
| 
|-
| rowspan="2"|Destroyer Type-A
| Kagerō
| #112–114
| Arashi (#112), Hagikaze (#113),  Maikaze (#114), Akigumo (#115)
| #115 was converted from the Yūgumo class
| 
|-
| Yūgumo
| #115–129
| Yūgumo (#116), Makigumo (#117),  Kazagumo (#118), Naganami (#119), Makinami (#120), Takanami (#121), Ōnami (#122), Kiyonami (#123), Tamanami (#124), Suzunami (#126), Fujinami (#127)
| #115 was converted to the Kagerō class#125 was converted to the Shimakaze class#128 and #129 were dummy of naval budget of the Yamato-class battleships
| 
|-
| Destroyer Type-C
| Shimakaze
| 
| Shimakaze (#125)
| 
|-
| Aircraft carrier
| Taihō
| #130
| Taihō (#130)
| 
| 
|-
| Seaplane tender
| Akitsushima
| #131
| Akitsushima (#131)
| 
| 
|-
| Light cruiser Type-B
| Agano
| #132–135
| Agano (#132), Noshiro (#133), Yahagi (#134), Sakawa (#135)
| 
| 
|-
| Light cruiser Type-C
| Ōyodo
| #136–137
| Ōyodo (#136)
| 
| #137
|-
| Cruiser submarine Type-A
| I-9
| #138
| I-11 (#138) 
| 
| 
|-
| Cruiser submarine Type-B
| I-15
| #139–153
| I-26 (#139) to I-39 (#152) 
| #153 was dummy of naval budget of the Yamato-class battleships
| 
|-
| Large sized submarine
| I-176
| #154–163
| I-176 (#154) to I-185 (#163) 
| 
| 
|-
| Minesweeper
| No.19
| #164–169
| No.19 (#164) to No.24 (#169)
| 
| 
|-
| Minelayer
| Sokuten
| #170–179
| Hirashima (#170), Hōko (#171), Ishizaki (#172), Takashima (#173), Saishū (#174), Niizaki (#175), Yurijima (#176), Nuwajima (#177), Maeshima (#178)
|  
| #179
|-
| Subchaser
| No.13
| #180–183
| [[Japanese submarine chaser No.13|No.13']] (#180) to No.16 (#183)
| 
| 
|-
| Cable layer
| Hashima
| 
| Hashima, Tsurushima, Ōdate, Tateishi
| 
| 
|-
| rowspan="2"|Food supply ship
| No.4006
| 
| No.4006 (later renamed Kinesaki)
| 
| 
|-
| No.4007
| 
| No.4007 (later renamed Nosaki)
| 
| 
|-
|}

Notes

References
 Senshi Sōsho Vol.31, Naval armaments and war preparation (1), "Until November 1941"'', Asagumo Simbun (Japan), November 1969

See also
 1st Naval Armaments Supplement Programme (Maru 1 Keikaku, 1931)
 2nd Naval Armaments Supplement Programme (Maru 2 Keikaku, 1934)
 3rd Naval Armaments Supplement Programme (Maru 3 Keikaku, 1937)
 Temporal Naval Armaments Supplement Programme (Maru Rin Keikaku, 1940)
 Rapidly Naval Armaments Supplement Programme (Maru Kyū Keikaku, 1941)
 Additional Naval Armaments Supplement Programme (Maru Tui Keikaku, 1941)
 5th Naval Armaments Supplement Programme (Maru 5 Keikaku, 1941)
 6th Naval Armaments Supplement Programme (Maru 6 Keikaku, 1942)
 Modified 5th Naval Armaments Supplement Programme (Kai-Maru 5 Keikaku, 1942)
 Wartime Naval Armaments Supplement Programme (Maru Sen Keikaku, 1944)
 マル4計画 (ja)

Imperial Japanese Navy
Military history of Japan